Damien Bonnard (born 22 July 1978) is a French actor

Filmography

References

External links

 

1978 births
Living people
French male film actors
21st-century French male actors
People from Alès
Most Promising Actor Lumières Award winners